Oyin may refer to:

People
Oyin Adejobi (1926–2000), Nigerian chief, actor, and dramatist
Oyin Oladejo (born 1985), Nigerian-born Canadian actress

Places
Oyin-Akoko, a settlement in Nigeria